Albert Victor "Gus" Howell (25 June 1897 – 19 January 1970) was an Australian rules footballer who played with St Kilda and Footscray in the Victorian Football League (VFL).

Family
The son of William Andrew Howell (1868–1948), and Mary Howell (1869–1939), née Marshall, Albert Victor Howell was born at Brighton East, Victoria on 25 June 1897.

He married Rita May Burrows (1907–1992) in 1928.

Football

Footscray (VFL)
Cleared from Apollo Bay to Footscray on 30 April 1926.

Death
He died at the Mordialloc and Cheltenham Community Hospital, in Parkdale, Victoria on 19 January 1970.

Notes

References
 
 World War Two Nominal Roll: Private Albert Victor Howell (V357819), Department of Veterans' Affairs.
 B884, V357819: World War Two Service Record: Private Albert Victor Howell (V357819), National Archives of Australia.

External links 
 	
 
 Augustus V. "Gus" Howell (sic), at The VFA Project.

1897 births
1970 deaths
Australian rules footballers from Melbourne
St Kilda Football Club players
Western Bulldogs players
Brighton Football Club players
Northcote Football Club players
People from Brighton, Victoria